K85 or K-85 may refer to:

K-85 (Kansas highway), a state highway in Kansas
HMS Verbena (K85), a former UK Royal Navy ship
INS Vinash (K85), a former Indian Navy ship